A lava tree mold, sometimes erroneously called a lava tree cast, is a hollow lava formation that formed around a tree trunk. They are created when lava flows through an area of trees, coating their exterior. The lava cools just enough to create a solid crust around the trunk, but the tree inside burns away leaving a cavity. Molds of trees may be vertical or horizontal. In many cases, mold formation requires slow moving lava, as well as enough time for the mold to chill.

Methane explosions 
A unique phenomenon may occur during the formation of vertical tree molds. As the lava-encased tree burns away, the roots are heated up and generate a "producer" gas, such as methane. If the roots penetrate into a cavity, such as a lava tube or tumulus crack, it may come into contact with oxygen. Because there is a source of heat already present, the charred root or the lava itself, a methane explosion may follow if the oxygen and producer gas mixture is between 5 and 15% (volume-percent fuel).

See also
Lava cave

References

 
Volcanoes